Megachile babylonica is a species of bee in the family Megachilidae. It was described by Rebmann in 1970.

References

Babylonia
Insects described in 1970